The lake known as O'Higgins in Chile  and San Martín in Argentina is located around coordinates  in Patagonia, between the Aysén del General Carlos Ibáñez del Campo Region and the Santa Cruz Province.

General information

The lake is the deepest in the Americas with a maximum depth of  near O'Higgins Glacier, and its characteristic milky light-blue color comes from rock flour suspended in its waters. The O'Higgins Glacier flows eastwards towards the lake, as does the Chico Glacier.

Immigrants did not settle in the arid windy area around the lake until the 1910s, when British, Scandinavians and Swiss started raising sheep for wool.

The most common tourist route for visiting the lake is that between El Chaltén in Argentina and Villa O'Higgins in Chile, including a ferry through the lake on the Chilean side.

Water from O'Higgins/San Martín Lake flows into the Pacific Ocean through the Pascua River.

Names
Being the most irregular of the lakes in the area, consisting of eight well defined arms, the name San Martín is sometimes used to refer only to the Argentine side, and O'Higgins to the four Chilean arms. Both names come from independence heroes José de San Martín of Argentina and Bernardo O'Higgins of Chile, who fought together for the liberation of Chile, and came to be known as Liberators of America together with other South American figures.

The four Argentine arms of the lake, with an area of 521 km2, are named Cancha Rayada, Chacabuco, Maipú and De la Lancha, after battles of General San Martín.

See also

 Lake Viedma
 Lake Argentino
 List of international lakes

References

External links
Border crossing Chaltén to O'Higgins 
CECS, Depth of Lake O'Higgins/San Martín

San Martin Lake
O'Higgins Lake
Lakes of Aysén Region
International lakes of South America
Argentina–Chile border